Javorje (Serbian Cyrillic: Јаворје) is a mountain in western Serbia, near the town of Priboj. Its highest peak Ober has an elevation of 1,486 meters above sea level.

References

Mountains of Serbia